Frisak is a surname. Notable people with the surname include:

Aasmund Frisak (1852–1935), Norwegian naval officer
Nina Frisak (born 1950), Norwegian judge
Henrik Leganger Frisak (1852–1939), Norwegian judge
 

Norwegian-language surnames